A New Day... Live in Las Vegas is the first English-language live album by Canadian singer Celine Dion, released by Columbia Records on 14 June 2004. It includes songs from Dion's Las Vegas residency show, A New Day.... The album also features studio recordings of two new tracks: "You and I" and "Ain't Gonna Look the Other Way". A New Day... Live in Las Vegas reached top ten in Canada, United States, France, Belgium and Greece, and was certified Gold in the United States and Greece and Silver in the United Kingdom.

Content
A New Day... Live in Las Vegas features thirteen live tracks from Dion's successful Las Vegas show, called A New Day... and two previously unreleased studio tracks: "You and I" and "Ain't Gonna Look the Other Way". It was also released with a bonus DVD containing 45-min documentary, called One Year... One Heart.

A New Day... Live in Las Vegas includes five live songs which weren't available on Dion's previous albums: "Fever", "I've Got the World on a String", "I Wish", "If I Could" and "What a Wonderful World". The studio versions of last two songs were included on her next album Miracle.

"If I Could" was originally recorded by Nancy Wilson on her Nancy Now! album in 1988. In 1993 Ray Charles covered it on My World, as well as Regina Belle on her album Passion. Barbra Streisand included the song on her Higher Ground album in 1997.

The French edition of A New Day... Live in Las Vegas contains "Contre nature" as a bonus track.

The originally scheduled Live in Las Vegas - A New Day... DVD release date (autumn 2004) was postponed because of changes and improvements made to the show since the initial filming. A New Day... was re-shot in high-definition during the 17–21 January 2007 week and released on 7 December 2007. The two disc DVD contains more than 5 hours of never-before seen footage, including the concert and three exclusive documentaries. Live performances of "Nature Boy", "At Last", "Fever", "Et je t'aime encore" and "What a Wonderful World" are available only on A New Day... Live in Las Vegas CD, as they were removed from the show at the time of filming the DVD.

Critical reception

The album met with positive reviews. AllMusic said that "this live document of the Las Vegas show drives home the point that Celine is one of the most potent entertainers in adult contemporary music". According to them Dion is "equally as comfortable in high-tempo numbers chock-full of her signature vocal acrobatics as she is in quiet, contemplative moments. It's an ideal souvenir for those who have experienced the magic with their own ears and eyes. And while it's not the most definitive document of Dion's career, it certainly is a stirring testament to her accomplishments as the standard to whom most vocalists aspire".

Commercial performance
A New Day... Live in Las Vegas has sold 530,000 copies in the United States and was certified Gold by the RIAA. It was also certified Silver in the UK. The album reached top ten in many countries, including number one in Greece and Quebec, number two in Canada, number four in Belgium Wallonia, number seven in Belgium Flanders, number nine in France, and number ten in the United States.

Accolades

In 2005, A New Day... Live in Las Vegas was nominated for the Félix Award in category Anglophone Album of the Year.

Track listing
"You and I" was produced by Aldo Nova and Peer Åström, "Ain't Gonna Look the Other Way" by Anders Bagge, Åström and Vito Luprano, and "Contre nature" by Erick Benzi.

Charts

Certifications and sales

Release history

References

External links
 

2004 live albums
2004 video albums
Albums produced by Aldo Nova
Albums recorded at Caesars Palace
Celine Dion live albums
Celine Dion video albums